Shining Relics of Enlightened Body is numbered amongst the 'Seventeen Tantras of Menngagde' within Dzogchen discourse and is part of the textual support for the Vima Nyingtik.

Translation
Though no other predating version from the Tibetan is likely nor extant, the work is held to be a translation in the Nyingma Dzogchen tradition though no originating language is made apparent in the secondary literature. Martin (1994: p. 282)  holds that Vimalamitra was assigned to the translation group that was responsible for this work:
"The work was translated and verified by the Indian Master Vimalamitra and the Tibetan translator Ka-ba Dpal-brtsegs."
Ka-ba Dpal-brtsegs, important in the codification of the Tibetan Buddhist canon, is numbered as one of the 'twenty-five [principal] disciples' (Wylie: rje 'bang nyer lnga) of Padmasambhava.

Relics
Sarira are generic terms for "Buddhist relics", although in common usage these terms usually refer to a kind of  pearl or crystal-like bead-shaped objects that are purportedly found among the cremated ashes of Buddhist spiritual masters recovered from charnel grounds. Sarira are held to emanate or incite 'blessings' and 'grace' (Sanskrit: adhishthana) within the mindstream and experience of those connected to them.

Nomenclature, orthography and etymology

Overview
Martin (1994: p. 281)  relates that this Tantra, "Blazing Remains", takes the form of a dialogue between Vajradhara and the Dakini 'Clear Mind':
"We turn to the Nyingma tantra, the Sku-gdung 'Bar-ba ('Blazing Remains'). It belongs to the highest of three classes within the highest of the Nine Vehicles of the Nyingma school--the Precepts Class (Man-ngag Sde) of the Ati-yoga Vehicle. It is written in the form of a dialogue between the Buddha Vajradhara and the Skygoer (Mkha' - 'gro-ma) named Clear Mind (Gsal Yid)."

References

Dzogchen texts
Nyingma tantras